Valgerd Svarstad Haugland (born 23 August 1956) is a Norwegian teacher, politician and civil servant. 

She was leader of the Christian Democratic Party in Norway from 1995 to 2004. She was Minister of Children and Family Affairs from 1997 to 2000 and Minister of Culture from 2001 to 2005. Since 2019, she has been County Governor of Oslo and Viken. Prior to that, she served as county Governor of Oslo and Akershus from 2011 to 2018.

As Minister of Culture and Church Affairs she paid special attention to voluntary work.

She withdrew as party leader at an extraordinary annual assembly of the party on 23 January 2004. She was primarily held responsible for the poor results during the last local election, held in September 2003. In the 2005 parliamentary elections she failed to win a seat in parliament.

Until 2010 she was a board member of the Norwegian Broadcasting Corporation.

References

External links
 Biography on the Norwegian Storting site (in Norwegian)

1956 births
Living people
Christian Democratic Party (Norway) politicians
Women members of the Storting
Members of the Storting
Ministers of Children, Equality and Social Inclusion of Norway
Ministers of Culture of Norway
County governors of Norway
21st-century Norwegian politicians
21st-century Norwegian women politicians
20th-century Norwegian politicians
20th-century Norwegian women politicians
Women government ministers of Norway
People from Kvam